Oonopsis, or false goldenweed, is a genus of flowering plants in the family Asteraceae.

 Species
 Oonopsis engelmannii  (A.Gray) Greene - Kansas, Colorado
 Oonopsis foliosa Greene - Colorado
 Oonopsis multicaulis (Nutt.) Greene - Wyoming, Montana, Nebraska, South Dakota
 Oonopsis wardii (A.Gray) Greene - Wyoming, Colorado

References

Asteraceae genera
Astereae
Flora of the Western United States